The Arrowsmith Range is a mountain range in the South Island of New Zealand.
The range runs from southwest to northeast, parallel to the main ranges of the Southern Alps / Kā Tiritiri o te Moana. At the northeastern end, the range terminates at Jagged Peak, whence a ridge connects to the Jollie Range. The lower Potts Range is a continuation at the southwestern end of the range. The highest point on the range is Mount Arrowsmith.

It is believed that the range was named in honour of John Arrowsmith, the 19th century British cartographer.

Peaks
Named peaks from northwest to southeast

Rivers
The northwest side of the range is drained by the Lawrence River, a tributary of the Rangitata River, and the southeast side by the Ashburton River South Branch / Hakatere and the Cameron River which flows to Lake Heron.

Glaciers
Although the peaks do not have permanent ice or snow, there are a number of permanent snowfields and glaciers on the range:
 Jagged Glacier
 Douglas Glacier
 Cameron Glacier
 South Cameron Glacier
 Ashburton Glacier

References

Mountain ranges of Canterbury, New Zealand